Joseph Pitts may refer to:

 Joe Pitts (Pennsylvania politician) (born 1939), U.S. Representative from Pennsylvania
 Joe Pitts (Tennessee politician) (born 1958), member of the Tennessee House of Representatives
 Joseph Pitts (author) (1663–1735), Englishman who was taken into slavery by Barbary pirates